Yves Charnay (born 25 January 1942 in Saint-Chamond, Loire) is a French Light Artist and painter.

About 
The artist deals in recent times mainly with light installations, perspective art works and paintings.
Some of his works are displayed in China and Germany, such as Les couleur de l'esprit "
in the state parliament of Saxony-Anhalt or the spatial anamorphosis of Schloss Brake (Lemgo), which was created
in cooperation with Claude Prévost. The latest international work is the  "Gestes réfléchis" in JiangYin, China.
Besides being a light and object artist, he appears also as a painter, Curator of international exhibitions,
film writer and artistic consultant for cinema and television.

Works 
Lumière mise en œuvre - 2010, Albi, France
Gestes réfléchis - 2009, Jiang Yin, China
Farbcharta für Tanggu - 2008, Tanggu, China 
Conversation - 2006, Lyon, France
Le temps déployé - 2006,  Weserrenaissance-Museum, Lemgo, Germany
Les calligraphies du vent - 2005, Shanghai, China
Jardin à la française - 2005, Hangzhou, China 
Innocence - 2005, Brive, France
Poème en vers nanométriques - 2004, Magdeburg, Germany
Les couleurs de l'esprit - 2003, parlement of Saxony-Anhalt, Magdeburg, Germany
Lumières -2002, Enghien-les-bains, France
L'azur en pré fleurit - 2002, Louroux, France
Notre Dame des couleurs - 2002, Soulatgé, Frankreich 
Des couleurs tombées du ciel - 2000, Apt en Provence, France

External links
 yves-charnay.com

1942 births
Living people
People from Saint-Chamond
French artists